Marlon Graham (born 27 September 1978) is a Barbadian cricketer and coach. He played in two List A matches for the Barbados cricket team in 2010. In October 2021, Graham was named in the Bahamas Twenty20 International (T20I) squad for the 2021 ICC Men's T20 World Cup Americas Qualifier tournament in Antigua. He made his T20I debut on 7 November 2021, for the Bahamas against Canada.

See also
 List of Barbadian representative cricketers

References

External links
 

1978 births
Living people
Barbadian cricketers
Bahamas Twenty20 International cricketers
Barbados cricketers
Bahamian cricketers